Indian Trusts Act, 1882 is a law in India relating to private trusts and trustees. The Act defines what would lawfully be called as a trust and who can legally be its trustees and provides a definition for them. The Indian Trusts Amendment Bill of 2015 amended the Act and removed some restrictions on investment of the monetary assets by the trust in certain investments. But at the same time, it enabled the government to scrutinise the trusts' investments at will

Content
The Act defines how the author of the trust could create a trust and assign trustees and assign his monetary assets to be controlled by the trust. This trust should have a clear definition of the following:

 Intention by the author to create the trust
 Purpose of the trust
 The beneficiary of the monetary assets controlled by the trust
 The monetary assets assigned to the trust for the purpose defined above
 Grants control of the monetary assets to the trustee which can include the author of the trust

In addition the act also explains trustees 
 have to be impartial
 can not convert property and monetary assets to profitable property outside the limits of the purpose for which the trust was created
 have to understand completely the statutes of the trust
 can benefit from being the trustee by claiming expenses and salary from the trust for his work
 can sometimes act singly if required
 cannot breach the trust of the author or the purpose of the trust

In addition investments of a trust if found to be against the law of the land can be the cause of dissolution of the trust and action can be taken against the trust

See also
English trusts law

References

Wills and trusts
1882 in India
1882 in law